The 2000 Women's Olympic Water Polo Qualifying Tournament was a tournament in which three places were available for teams to qualify for the first Olympic women's polo competition.

Teams

GROUP A
 
 

GROUP B
 

 

GROUP C
 
 

GROUP D

Preliminary round

GROUP A

April 22, 2000

April 23, 2000

April 24, 2000

GROUP B

April 22, 2000

April 23, 2000

April 24, 2000

GROUP C

April 22, 2000

April 23, 2000

April 24, 2000

GROUP D

Only Great Britain did not contest the semifinal and final rounds, having finished fourth in its group.
April 22, 2000

April 23, 2000

April 24, 2000

Second round

GROUP E

April 26, 2000

April 27, 2000

April 28, 2000

GROUP F

April 26, 2000

April 27, 2000

April 28, 2000

Play-Offs
April 29, 2000 — 9th/12th place

April 29, 2000 — 5th/8th place

April 29, 2000 — 1st/4th place

Finals
April 30, 2000 — Eleventh place

April 30, 2000 — Ninth place

April 30, 2000 — Seventh place

April 30, 2000 — Fifth place

April 30, 2000 — Third place

April 30, 2000 — First place

Final ranking

Russia, United States and Kazakhstan qualified for the 2000 Summer Olympics in Sydney, Australia

Individual awards
Most Valuable Player

Best Goalkeeper

Best Scorer

See also
 2000 Men's Water Polo Olympic Qualifier

References
  FINA

Qual
2000 in Italian sport
2000
Olymp